Pty or PTY may refer to:

 Proprietary company, a business structure in Australia and South Africa
 Tocumen International Airport (IATA Airport code), Panama
 Pseudoterminal, a virtual device class in Unix operating systems
 Programme Type, in the FM broadcast Radio Data System